Are was a municipality located in Pärnu County, one of the 15 counties of Estonia.

Settlements
Small borough
Are
Villages
Eavere, Elbu, Kurena, Lepplaane, Murru, Niidu, Parisselja, Pärivere, Suigu, Tabria, Võlla.

References

External links
 Official website (outdated) 

Former municipalities of Estonia